Zig Zag is the fourth studio album by American rock band the Hooters, released in 1989 by Columbia Records.

Background
With Zig Zag, the Hooters moved toward a more political and folk music direction, contrasting significantly with their previous light-hearted songs.  On this album, the songs dealt with the death of a friend, the demise of vinyl records and intrusion of technology, homelessness, a tribute to their own friendship, and even Beijing's Tiananmen Square protests of 1989.

One of the songs, "500 Miles", featuring folk music trio Peter, Paul and Mary on background vocals, dated back to the American Civil War when it was called "Ruben's Train".  Additional lyrics were written for the song by keyboard player Rob Hyman, guitarist Eric Bazilian and the album's producer, Rick Chertoff.  These lyrics included a reference to Tank Man, or the Unknown Rebel, an anonymous man who became internationally famous when he was videotaped and photographed standing in front of Chinese military tanks and preventing their advance during the Tiananmen Square protests on June 5, 1989.

"Give the Music Back" dealt with the demise of Record Plant Studios, a famous recording studio in New York City, where the Hooters would be among the last musicians to record there before it closed down in 1988.

Zig Zag was the third and final album the Hooters released on Columbia Records.

Track listing

 "Brother, Don't You Walk Away" (Rob Hyman, Eric Bazilian, Rick Chertoff) – 4:28
 "Deliver Me" (Hyman, Bazilian) – 4:06
 "500 Miles" (Hedy West, additional lyrics by Hyman, Bazilian, Chertoff) – 4:25
 "You Never Know Who Your Friends Are" (Hyman, Bazilian, Chertoff) – 4:04
 "Heaven Laughs" (Hyman, Bazilian, Chertoff) – 4:19
 "Don't Knock It 'Til You Try It" (Hyman, Bazilian) – 4:17
 "Give The Music Back" (Hyman, Bazilian) – 5:15
 "Always A Place" (Hyman, Bazilian) – 4:03
 "Mr. Big Baboon" (Hyman, Bazilian, Chertoff) – 3:54
 "Beat Up Guitar"  (Hyman, Bazilian) – 4:09

Personnel
Adapted from the album liner notes.

The Hooters
Eric Bazilian – lead vocals, lead and rhythm guitars, stringed and wind instruments
Rob Hyman – lead vocals, acoustic and electric keyboards
John Lilley – guitar
Fran Smith Jr. – bass, vocals
David Uosikkinen – drums

Additional musicians
Peter, Paul and Mary – backing vocals on "500 Miles"
Joel Dubay and – backing vocals on "Don't Knock It 'Til You Try It"
Todd Haug – backing vocals on "Don't Knock It 'Til You Try It"
Rick Chertoff – trumpet on "Don't Knock It 'Til You Try It"

Technical
Rick Chertoff – producer
Eric Bazilian – co-producer
Rob Hyman – co-producer
John Agnello – engineer
Phil Nicolo – engineer
Teddy Trewhella – assistant engineer
Steve Churchyard – mixing (at Record Plant, NYC)
George Marino – mastering (at Sterling Sound, NYC)
Janet Perr – art direction, design
Robert Diadul – photography

Charts

References

1989 albums
The Hooters albums
Albums produced by Eric Bazilian
Columbia Records albums
Albums produced by Rick Chertoff
Albums produced by Rob Hyman